Hopea exalata is a species of tree in the family Dipterocarpaceae. It is endemic to Hainan Island in southern China and enjoys second-class national protection. Some authors consider H. exalata as a junior synonym of Hopea reticulata that is also known from Vietnam. Hopea exalata produces Hopeanol.

References

Trees of China
Endemic flora of China
exalata
Vulnerable plants
Taxonomy articles created by Polbot